Robert Crawford (1874 – 28 July 1946) was an Ulster Unionist Party politician. He was Chairman of Antrim County Council for 23 years.  At the 1921 Northern Ireland general election he was elected as a Member of Parliament (MP) for Antrim, and held that seat until it was abolished at the 1929 general election, when he was elected for the new Mid Antrim constituency. He retired from politics at the 1938 Northern Ireland general election.

Crawford was also the senior elder of the First Ballymena Presbyterian Church, and ran its Sunday school for more than fifty years.

References

1874 births
1946 deaths
Ulster Unionist Party members of the House of Commons of Northern Ireland
Members of the House of Commons of Northern Ireland for County Antrim constituencies
Members of the House of Commons of Northern Ireland 1921–1925
Members of the House of Commons of Northern Ireland 1925–1929
Members of the House of Commons of Northern Ireland 1929–1933
Members of the House of Commons of Northern Ireland 1933–1938
Members of Armagh County Council
Politicians from County Antrim
Ulster Unionist Party councillors